Kulothunga was the name of several later Chola kings in India:
 Kulothunga Chola I, reigned 1070–1120
 Kulothunga Chola II, reigned 1135–1150
 Kulothunga Chola III, reigned 1178–1218